The 1885 Richmond Colts football team was an American football team that represented Richmond College—now known as the University of Richmond—as an independent during the 1885 college football season.

Schedule

References

Richmond
Richmond Spiders football seasons
Richmond Colts football